Alexander Schlager (born 1 February 1996) is an Austrian professional footballer who plays as a goalkeeper for Austrian Bundesliga club LASK and the Austria national team.

International career
He was the captain for Austria U-21 in Euro U-21 2019.

On 16 November 2019, Schlager played his first match for Austria's national team in the deciding UEFA Euro 2020 qualifier against North Macedonia in Vienna.

Career statistics

Club

International

References

1996 births
Living people
Austrian footballers
Austria international footballers
Austrian Football Bundesliga players
2. Liga (Austria) players
FC Red Bull Salzburg players
Floridsdorfer AC players
SV Grödig players
FC Liefering players
RB Leipzig players
UEFA Euro 2020 players
Austrian expatriate footballers
Expatriate footballers in Germany
Austrian expatriate sportspeople in Germany
Association football goalkeepers
LASK players
Footballers from Salzburg